Joseph-Octave Latour (11 February 1906 – 22 May 1975) was a Progressive Conservative party member of the House of Commons of Canada. He was a notary by career.

Latour was born in Saint-Jérôme, Quebec and attended school at Saint-Jérôme Collegiate, Sainte-Thérèse Seminary, and the Université de Montréal where he attained a Bachelor of Arts degree.

Between 1945 and 1958 he was registrar for Deux-Montagnes County.

After an unsuccessful campaign at the Argenteuil—Deux-Montagnes riding in the 1957 election, he was elected there in the 1958 election. After serving one term, the 24th Canadian Parliament, Latour lost his seat in the 1962 election to Vincent Drouin of the Liberal party.

References

External links
 

1906 births
1975 deaths
Lawyers in Quebec
Members of the House of Commons of Canada from Quebec
People from Saint-Jérôme
Progressive Conservative Party of Canada MPs
Université de Montréal alumni
20th-century Canadian lawyers